"Please Bring Your Love Back" is the fourth and final single released from Angela Winbush's second album, The Real Thing. "Please Bring Your Love Back" peaked at number 70 on the US R&B chart.

Charts

Angela Winbush songs
1990 singles
Songs written by Angela Winbush
1989 songs
PolyGram singles